The 1942 United States Senate election in Colorado took place on November 3, 1942. Incumbent Democratic Senator Edwin C. Johnson was re-elected to second term over Republican Governor Ralph L. Carr.

Democratic primary

Candidates
Benjamin C. Hilliard, Justice of the Colorado Supreme Court and former U.S. Representative
Edwin C. Johnson, incumbent Senator since 1937

Results

Republican primary

Candidates
Ralph L. Carr, Governor of Colorado

Results
Carr was unopposed for the Republican nomination.

General election

Candidates
James Allander (Communist)
Ralph L. Carr, Governor of Colorado (Republican)
Edwin C. Johnson, incumbent Senator since 1937 (Democratic)
Carle Whitehead (Socialist)

Results

See also 
 1942 United States Senate elections

References 

1942
Colorado
United States Senate